Václav Svoboda (born 12 January 1990) is a Czech professional footballer who played in the Dutch Eerste Divisie for Veendam as a forward.

External links
 
 Voetbal International profile

1990 births
Living people
Czech footballers
Czech expatriate footballers
SC Veendam players
Eerste Divisie players
Expatriate footballers in the Netherlands
People from Mělník
Association football forwards
Sportspeople from the Central Bohemian Region